The foreign relations of the Mayor of London are carried out as part of his responsibility to promote Greater London's global links on behalf of the British capital.  In addition to work done as part of the 2012 London Olympics, the Greater London Authority (GLA) estimates that 700,000 jobs in London depend on foreign companies and the tourist industry.

The GLA maintained several overseas offices: in Brussels (in conjunction with London Councils), Beijing/Shanghai and Delhi/Mumbai, as well as consultancies operating from Caracas and Moscow.  As part of his reduction of the GLA's budget Boris Johnson pledged to review overseas offices and currently only the Beijing and Brussels offices are operational.

The Mayor of London Ken Livingstone signed city partnerships during his terms with:

Beijing
Delhi
Moscow
New York City
Paris
Tokyo

During his mayoralty, Boris Johnson signed partnership agreements with New York City, Paris and Tokyo.

References

External links
Mayor of London international page

Politics of London
Local government in London
Mayor Of London
Foreign relations of England